Joseph Patrick McDonnell (born 19 May 1994) is an English professional footballer who plays as a goalkeeper for Eastleigh.

Playing career

Basingstoke Town
McDonnell came through the ranks at Basingstoke Town under the guidance of academy manager Jason Bristow, who gave him his first contract after playing amateur cricket up until around the age of 16 or 17. McDonnell was also previously coached by current AFC Wimbledon goalkeeping coach Ashley Bayes at Basingstoke, who he credits with influencing him to become a goalkeeper.

After graduating from the Basingstoke academy, McDonnell made two league appearances for the Dragons during the 2012–13 season, and a further four the following season, as well as spending time on loan at Hendon. He made a total of twelve appearances for Basingstoke Town in all competitions.

AFC Wimbledon
In July 2014, he signed a professional contract at AFC Wimbledon after turning down interest from other clubs. After featuring as a mainstay on Wimbledon's bench for the first half of the season, McDonnell made his first team début on 14 February 2015, coming on as a 23rd-minute substitute in the 2–0 away loss to Shrewsbury Town after James Shea was stretchered off.

He was released by Wimbledon at the end of the 2018-19 season. However, on 2 August 2019, he re-signed for the club on a short-term contract after an injury to first choice goalkeeper Nathan Trott.

Notts County
On 3 February 2020, McDonnell signed for Notts County, on a contract until the end of the current season.

Eastleigh
On 14 August 2020, McDonnell signed for Eastleigh. After appearing in every minute of the National League as of the awards ceremony as well as every minute in the FA Cup, McDonnell was awarded the Eastleigh Player of the Season award.

On 18 June 2021, McDonnel signed a contract extension for Eastleigh till the end of the 2022–23 season.

Statistics

Honours
Individual
Eastleigh Player of the Season: 2020–21

References

External links

Living people
English footballers
Association football goalkeepers
Basingstoke Town F.C. players
Hendon F.C. players
AFC Wimbledon players
Hampton & Richmond Borough F.C. players
Harrow Borough F.C. players
Notts County F.C. players
Eastleigh F.C. players
English Football League players
National League (English football) players
Isthmian League players
1994 births
Sportspeople from Basingstoke
Footballers from Hampshire